Raymond C. Crittenden IV (born March 1, 1970 in Washington D.C.) is a former American football wide receiver who played three sports in college at Virginia Tech  He is a graduate of Annandale High School in Annandale, Virginia. Crittenden attended Virginia Tech on a soccer scholarship, and set tech single-season records for goals (15) and points (34). He played football in his final two years for the Hokies, when he caught nine passes for 113 yards and returned seven kickoffs for a 19.9-yard average. He was also on the basketball team. His accomplishments at Tech earned him a spot in the university's sports hall of fame. 
 
Crittenden's speed caught the attention of pro scouts, even though he played sparingly as a college football player.  He was consistently running  sub-4.4 40-yard dashes.  He was undrafted in the 1993 NFL Draft, but was signed by the New England Patriots following spring min-camp. Crittenden played in 46 games (44 with New England and 2 with the San Diego Chargers), catching 44 passes for 672 yards and 4 touchdowns.

References

1970 births
Living people
People from Washington, D.C.
Virginia Tech Hokies football players
New England Patriots players
San Diego Chargers players
American football wide receivers
People from Annandale, Virginia
Sportspeople from Fairfax County, Virginia
Annandale High School alumni